Agnes Morton and Elizabeth Ryan were the defending champions, but Morton did not participate. Ryan partnered with Suzanne Lenglen, and went on to defeat Dorothea Lambert Chambers and Ethel Larcombe in the final, 4–6, 7–5, 6–3 to win the ladies' doubles tennis title at the 1919 Wimbledon Championships.

Draw

Finals

Top half

Bottom half

References

External links

Women's Doubles
Wimbledon Championship by year – Women's doubles
Wimbledon Championships - Doubles
Wimbledon Championships - Doubles